Săveni is a commune located in Ialomița County, Muntenia, Romania. It is composed of two villages, Frățilești and Săveni. It also included Lăcusteni and Platonești villages until 2005, when they were split off to form Platonești Commune.

References

Communes in Ialomița County
Localities in Muntenia